Jorg Smeets (born 5 November 1970, in Bussum) is a Dutch former footballer who played as a midfielder.

External links

1970 births
Living people
Dutch footballers
Dutch expatriate footballers
Expatriate footballers in England
Expatriate footballers in Portugal
Dutch expatriate sportspeople in Portugal
FC Volendam players
FC Utrecht players
Heracles Almelo players
Wigan Athletic F.C. players
Chester City F.C. players
C.S. Marítimo players
Helmond Sport players
People from Bussum
Association football midfielders
Dutch expatriate sportspeople in England
Footballers from North Holland